Wendy is a given name.

Wendy may also refer to:

People
 Thomas Wendy (died 1560), royal physician to King Henry VIII of England and Member of Parliament
 Thomas Wendy (MP) (1614–1673), English politician and Member of Parliament
 Wendy (singer) (born 1994), Korean singer Son Seung-wan, member of the South Korean girl group Red Velvet

Places
 Wendy, Cambridgeshire, England, UK; a hamlet

Arts and entertainment
 "Wendy" (song), by The Beach Boys
 "Windy" (song), by The Association
 "Wendy", a song from the 1954 Broadway musical Peter Pan
 Wendy (TV series), a German animated children's series
 The Wendy Williams Show (TV series), a U.S. talk show, known by its logo as "Wendy"
 Wendy (film), a 2020 American drama film, also based on Peter Pan

Other uses
 Wendy's, a North American chain of fast-food restaurants
 , a United States Navy patrol vessel in commission from 1917 to 1918
 List of storms named Wendy

See also

 Wendy house, a toy house
 Wendi (disambiguation)
 Wends, a historical name for Slavs living near Germanic settlement areas
 Wende (disambiguation)
 Wenden (disambiguation)